Qameshlu (also Romanized as Qameshlū) is a village in Akhtarabad Rural District, in the Central District of Malard County, Tehran Province, Iran. At the 2006 census, its population was 11, in 6 families.

References 

Populated places in Malard County